Oakville Transit is the public transportation provider in Oakville, Ontario, Canada since 1972. It is a department of the town and a member of the Canadian Urban Transit Association. It offers the typical conventional bus service, and a para-transit service, called care-A-van, for those unable to use the conventional service. The care-A-van takes riders directly to the address they desire.

The original logo for Oakville Transit, no longer in use, was by renowned designer Stuart Ash.

Routes and connections
The Oakville GO rail and bus station, located at 214 Cross Avenue, is the main bus terminus.
Oakville Transit connects with Burlington Transit to the west, and MiWay to the east. In addition, Oakville, Bronte, and Clarkson GO stations are also connected.
Regular routes:

School Specials:
 Route 71 White Oaks S.S. (afternoon special to River Oaks)
 Route 80W Holy Trinity West special (to and from McCraney)
 Route 80E Holy Trinity East special (to and from Falgarwood)
 Route 81A/B Abbey Park/Loyola (morning special from Palermo and Westoak Trails)
 Route 81N Abbey Park/Loyola North (afternoon special to Westoak Trails and Palermo)
 Route 81S Abbey Park/Loyola South (afternoon special to Glen Abbey)
 Route 82 Loyola North (afternoon special to Westoak Trails and Palermo)
 Route 83 Blakelock (afternoon specials to Oakville GO station and Bridge/Third Line)
 Route 86 Garth Webb S.S. (to and from Westoak Trails and Palermo)

All Oakville Transit buses are Easier Access

Terminals
 Oakville GO Station (with connections to Via Rail, Canada's national passenger rail service and Amtrak trains to the United States).
 Bronte GO Station
 Oakville Bus Terminal, located at Dunn and Church Streets.
 South Oakville Centre (formerly known as Hopedale Mall).
 Uptown Core, where the Crosstown route meets the Uptown Core route.
 Maplegrove Village, at Maplegrove Dr. and Cornwall Rd.
 Sheridan College, Trafalgar Campus.
 Clarkson GO Station (with connections to Mississauga's MiWay service).
 South Common Centre Bus Terminal (with connections to Mississauga's MiWay service).

Fleet
Oakville Transit has a fleet of 89 low-floor, fully accessible conventional buses and ten care-A-van (para transit) buses.

Fares
As of 11 August 2022, cash fare is $4.00 for everyone ages 13 and older. Passengers using GO Transit can transfer onto Oakville Transit free of charge so long as the passenger can show the driver their single, multi-ride GO ride ticket or by swiping the Presto card or contactless credit card. Children ages 0-12 can ride all Oakville Transit bus services free of charge (similar to that already in place on adjacent Burlington Transit and GO Transit services), while, students (13–19 years of age) attending elementary/secondary school, and seniors (65 years of age and older) can pay at reduced fare rates using their Presto card.  Customers can also pay their Oakville Transit bus fares using a contactless credit card (VISA, Mastercard and American Express) and their associated mobile wallets and pay the equivalent of the current Oakville Transit cash fare price by tapping it onto a PRESTO fare reader.  Oakville Transit also issues time-based transfers, valid for any direction of use for 2 hours from the time of boarding (including transfers to/from Burlington Transit and Miway (Mississauga Transit) services.

See also

 Public transport in Canada

References

External links

Oakville Transit website
 Drawings and photos of Oakville Transit buses

1972 establishments in Ontario
Municipal government of Oakville, Ontario
Transport in Oakville, Ontario
Transit agencies in Ontario